Nasty Gal is the third studio album by American funk musician Betty Davis. It was released in 1975 on Island Records and was Davis' first album on a major label.

It failed commercially upon release, and after the failure of this album Island Records shelved her planned follow-up, Is It Love or Desire?, until 2009. Under pressure by the record company, Davis abandoned her music career altogether shortly after this album's release. It was reissued on Light in the Attic Records in 2009 on CD, and again in 2018 on colored vinyl in conjunction with record club Vinyl Me, Please, which has rekindled interest in the album by music critics and fans, generating favorable retrospective reviews.

Background
After the underground success of her previous two records, Davis toured extensively with a backup band called "Funk House" that included Nicky Neal, Larry Johnson, Fred Mills, and Carlos Morales. Her tours were marked by her exuding sexuality. When ABC acquired her previous label Just Sunshine and its parent distributor Blue Thumb Records, Island Records approached Davis with a buyout offer. After accepting, Davis started working on new material for an album. On Davis' previous two albums, she relied on a multitude of session musicians, but felt a close connection with Funk House, so she chose to record the album with them instead.

Critical reception

Initial reviews for the album were unfavorable. Critics believed Davis' image eclipsed her actual talent. Davis had plans to release a fourth album, Is It Love or Desire?, and even recorded a few tracks before being ultimately shelved by Island. These sessions, which had featured Herbie Hancock, Chuck Rainey, Alphonse Mouzon, among others, were released in 2009 by Light in the Attic. After becoming disillusioned with the music industry, Davis retired.

After Light in the Attic reissued Davis' discography, contemporary reviews cropped up and have been much more positive, often noting that the album displays potential wasted by Island Records' dismissal of Davis' music and style.

Track listing

Charts

Personnel
Adapted from LP liner notes.
Betty Davis – vocals, producer, arrangement
Larry Johnson – bass guitar
Nicky Neal – drums, backing vocals
Fred Mills – keyboards, vocals on "Nasty Gal", backing vocals
Carlos Morales – lead guitar, lead vocals on "Gettin Kicked Off, Havin Fun", backing vocals
Errol Bennett – congas
James Allen Smith – synthesizer
Buddy Williams – bass drum
Gil Evans – conductor and arrangement on "You and I"
Bob Clearmountain – engineering
Josea Rodriguez – mastering

References

1975 albums
Betty Davis albums